The 2022 Arnold Palmer Cup was a team golf competition to be held from 1–3 July 2022 at Golf Club de Genève, Vandœuvres, Switzerland. It was the 26th time the event had been contested and the fifth under the new format in which women golfers play in addition to men, and the United States plays an international team. The international team won the match 33–27.

Format
The contest was played over three days. On Friday, there were 12 mixed four-ball matches. On Saturday there were 24 foursomes matches, 12 in the morning, six all-women matches and six all-men matches, and 12 mixed matches in the afternoon. 24 singles matches were played on Sunday. In all, 60 matches were played.

Each of the 60 matches was worth one point in the larger team competition. If a match was all square after the 18th hole, each side earned half a point toward their team total. The team that accumulated at least 30½ points won the competition.

Teams
The teams were announced on 19 April 2022. Six women and six men from each team were selected from the final Arnold Palmer Cup Rankings. Natasha Andrea Oon and Eugenio Chacarra were selected for the international team but turned professional before the event.

Friday's mixed fourball matches
The International team took a one-point lead after the opening round of matches after winning five of the 12 matches. The United States won four with the other three matches tied.

Saturday's matches

Morning foursomes matches
The International team won the second session by a point and increased their lead to two points.

Afternoon mixed foursomes matches
The United States won the second session by 7 points to 5, to level the match.

Sunday's singles matches
The International team regained the Arnold Palmer Cup by 33 points to 27, winning 13 matches to the 7 wins by the United States. Four matches finished as ties.

Michael Carter award
The Michael Carter Award winners were James Leow and Cole Sherwood.

References

External links
Arnold Palmer Cup official site

Arnold Palmer Cup
Golf tournaments in Switzerland
Arnold Palmer Cup
Arnold Palmer Cup
Arnold Palmer Cup
Arnold Palmer Cup